Mansouria is an area in Capital Governorate in Kuwait City. It is home of Al-Arabi Sporting Club.

References

Suburbs of Kuwait City